A number of steamships have carried the name Vega, including

, Adolf Erik Nordenskiöld sailed in 1878 in the Vega from Gothenburg along the coast of Siberia to Yokohama on his discovery of the Northeast Passage
, a Swedish steamship chartered by the Red Cross during World War II.
SS Vega, bult in 1895, ex Gambia renamed in 1915, sunk in 1916 by a U-Boat near Barcelona 
SS Vega, a Swedish steamship, built 1897 in Flensburg for the danish company Nordsöen, Copenhagen. Original name was Nordland, which struck a mine and sank on 20 December 1939
SS Vega, passenger cargo steamship built in 1898, called Tjaldur until 1904 when it was renamed Dora until name changed in 1939 to Vega when it was registered in Panama. In June 1942 it was sold to Nazi Germany's Kriegsmarine and rebuilt in Naples, used as a supply ship to North Africa it was shelled and sunk in December 1942 off Tunis by the British Navy
NYK Vega, 94,000 ton container ship built in 2008
MV Vega, 30,000 ton container ship which on 27 October 2010 rescued 98 fishermen who had abandoned their vessel, the Athena, after it caught fire in the Celtic Sea.

Books
 Printed in 1882. The Voyage of the Vega and its results. Arctic exploration by Ellen M. Clerke
 Printed in 1996. A tribute to the SS Vega. Supply ship for the Channel Islands by Keith Taylor

References

External links
 Photo of the Red Cross ship SS Vega in 1944

Ship names